Raymond Ostby Arsenault (born January 6, 1948) is an American historian and academic in Florida, United States of America. He has taught at the University of South Florida, St. Petersburg campus since 1980 and is the John Hope Franklin Professor of Southern History and co-director of the Florida Studies Program (with Gary Mormino). Arsenault is a specialist in the political, social, and environmental history of the American South.

Arsenault wrote about the 1961 Freedom Rides in 2006. His work on the critical event in the Civil Rights Movement became the basis of the 2010 documentary, Freedom Riders. He appeared on The Oprah Winfrey Show in an episode dedicated to Freedom Riders. He has been awarded the Frank L. and Harriet C. Owsley Award of the Southern Historical Association and the 2006 PSP Award for Excellence Honorable Mention History & American Studies.

Early life and education
Raymond Arsenault was born in Hyannis, Massachusetts in 1948. He holds a B.A. in History from Princeton University (1969, Magna cum laude), M.A. Brandeis University (1974) (American History), and a PhD in American History from Brandeis University (1981).

Career
Arsenault taught at the University of Minnesota, Brandeis University, and Universite d’Angers, in France, where he was a Fulbright Lecturer in 1984-85.  He has served as a consultant for numerous museums and public institutions, including the National Park Service, the National Civil Rights Museum, the Rosa Parks Library and Museum at Troy University in Alabama, and the United States Information Agency.

Personal life
He is married to Kathleen Hardee Arsenault, retired University library dean. The couple have two daughters, Amelia (32) and Anne (29).

Publications
 Arsenault, Raymond. (2018) Arthur Ashe: A Life. Simon & Schuster.
Arsenault, Raymond & Vernon Burton (Editors) (2013) Dixie Redux: Essays in Honor of Sheldon Hackney. Montgomery: New South Books.
 Arsenault, Raymond. (2011) Abridged Version: Freedom Riders: 1961 and the Struggle for Racial Justice New York: Oxford University Press.
 Arsenault, Raymond. (2009) The Sound of Freedom: Marian Anderson, the Lincoln Memorial, and the concert that awakened America New York: Bloomsbury Press. 
 Arsenault, Raymond. (2008) The Third Space of Enunciation: Proceedings of the English Department Conference, 9–10 March 2006 (Editor)(Gabes, Tunisia: High Institute of Languages, Gabes, 2008).
 Arsenault, Raymond. (2006) Freedom Riders: 1961 and the Struggle for Racial Justice New York: Oxford University Press.
 Arsenault, Raymond. (2005) Paradise Lost? The Environmental History of Florida. Gainesville: University Press of Florida. (Co-editor with Jack E. Davis)
 Arsenault, Raymond. (2002) The Changing South of Gene Patterson: Journalism and Civil Rights, 1960-1968. Gainesville: University Press of Florida. (Co-editor with Roy Peter Clark)
 Arsenault, Raymond. (Editor) (1991) Crucible of Liberty: 200 Years of the Bill of Rights. New York: The Free Press, 1991.
 Arsenault, Raymond. (1988) St. Petersburg and the Florida Dream, 1888-1950. Norfolk: Donning. (2nd. Ed.: Gainesville: University Press of Florida, 1996) (Paperback edition, 1998)(awarded the 1990 Charlton Tebeau Prize).
 Arsenault, Raymond. (1984) "The End of the Long Hot Summer: The Air Conditioner and Southern Culture." Journal of Southern History. 50(4): 597-628.
 Arsenault, Raymond. (1984) The Wild Ass of the Ozarks: Jeff Davis and the Social Bases of Southern Politics. Philadelphia: Temple University Press. (paperback: Knoxville: Univ. of Tennessee Press, 1988).(awarded the 1985 Virginia Ledbetter Prize).

References

External links
 Raymond Arsenault at University of South Florida
 Raymond Arsenault, website

Living people
Princeton University alumni
Brandeis University alumni
University of South Florida faculty
Environmental historians
1948 births
People from Hyannis, Massachusetts
Historians of the United States
21st-century American historians
21st-century American male writers
Historians from Massachusetts
American male non-fiction writers